Conus tinianus, common name the variable cone, is a species of sea snail, a marine gastropod mollusk in the family Conidae, the cone snails and their allies.

Like all species within the genus Conus, these snails are predatory and venomous. They are capable of "stinging" humans, therefore live ones should be handled carefully or not at all.

Description
The size of the shell varies between 20 mm and 60 mm. The thin shell is striated towards the base. Its color is reddish chestnut clouded with gray, and irregularly ornamented with indistinct fillets of articulated white and chestnut. The spire is obtusely convex. The apex is rose-tinted.

Distribution
This marine species occurs off the east coast of South Africa.

References

 Lamarck, J. B. P. A., 1810. Description des espèces du genre Cône. Annales du Muséum d'Histoire Naturelle 15: 422–442
 
 Filmer R.M. (2001). A Catalogue of Nomenclature and Taxonomy in the Living Conidae 1758 - 1998. Backhuys Publishers, Leiden. 388pp.
 Branch, G.M. et al. (2002). Two Oceans. 5th impression. David Philip, Cate Town & Johannesburg
 Tucker J.K. (2009). Recent cone species database. 4 September 2009 Edition
 Tucker J.K. & Tenorio M.J. (2009) Systematic classification of Recent and fossil conoidean gastropods. Hackenheim: Conchbooks. 296 pp

External links
 The Conus Biodiversity website
 Cone Shells – Knights of the Sea
 

tinianus
Gastropods described in 1792